Thibault Godefroy (born  in Bordeaux) is a French bobsledder.

Godefroy competed at the 2014 Winter Olympics for France. He teamed with Vincent Ricard, Jérémy Baillard and Jérémie Boutherin in the France-2 sled in the four-man event, finishing 23rd.

As of April 2014, his best showing at the World Championships is 23rd, coming in the two-man event in 2012.

Godefroy made his World Cup debut in December 2011. As of April 2014, his best finish is 18th, in a two-man event in 2011-12.

References

1985 births
Living people
Olympic bobsledders of France
Sportspeople from Bordeaux
Bobsledders at the 2014 Winter Olympics
French male bobsledders